Hygrobates is a genus of mites belonging to the family Hygrobatidae.

The genus has cosmopolitan distribution.

Species:
 Hygrobates acutidens Viets
 Hygrobates acutipalpis

References

Trombidiformes
Trombidiformes genera